The 2005 Hastings Direct International Championships was a women's tennis tournament played on grass courts at the Eastbourne Tennis Centre in Eastbourne in the United Kingdom that was part of Tier II of the 2005 WTA Tour. It was the 31st edition of the tournament and was held from June 13 through June 18, 2005.

Finals

Singles

 Kim Clijsters defeated  Vera Douchevina 7–5, 6–0
 It was Clijsters' 3rd singles title of the year and the 24th of her career.

Doubles

 Lisa Raymond /  Rennae Stubbs defeated  Elena Likhovtseva /  Vera Zvonareva 6–3, 7–5
 It was Raymond's 1st doubles title of the year and the 45th of her career. It was Stubbs' 1st title of the year and the 49th of her career.

References

External links 
 ITF Tournament Profile

Hastings Direct International Championships
Eastbourne International
2005 in English women's sport
June 2005 sports events in the United Kingdom
2005 in English tennis